Tygda is a rural locality (a selo) in Magdagachinsky District, Amur Oblast, Russia. The population is 3,319 as of 2010.

Historical population

References 

Rural localities in Magdagachinsky District